Emma Olivia Watkins (born 21 September 1989) is an Australian singer, actress, and dancer, best known as a former member of the children's group the Wiggles from 2013 to 2021. She debuted her own children's entertainment character, Emma Memma, in 2022; an accompanying television series entitled Emma Memma: Sing. Dance. Sign. is in development.

Early life
Watkins started ballet when she was four. She saw the Wiggles perform Irish dancing and later studied other styles of dance, including jazz, hip hop, tap and contemporary.  She attended The McDonald College, a performing arts school; won a full scholarship at the Sydney Film School; and completed a certificate specialising in musical theatre at ED5 International in Sydney.  Watkins earned a master's degree in Media Arts and Production at the University of Technology Sydney. She has taught dance to children since she was in high school. She has also performed in Bollywood films, learned drums and other percussion instruments, was crowned Miss Granny Smith Apples in 2009, and was learning Auslan, the Australian sign language, by 2012. As of 2021, she was doing her PhD research on sign language and dance.

Career

2010–2021: The Wiggles
In 2010, Watkins began performing with the Wiggles, first as Fairy Larissa and then as Wags the Dog, Dorothy the Dinosaur, and as a Wiggly Dancer. She used her film skills during tours with the group, providing them with video and editing services. In May 2012, the Wiggles announced that Watkins would become the first female Wiggle, replacing founding member Greg Page as the Yellow Wiggle. The original members stated that they chose Watkins because she was the most qualified for the job, and commented that it was "a strategy for marketing the Wiggles into the next generation".

Lisa Tolin of the Associated Press called Watkins a strong role model for girls, and reported that her fans came to concerts dressed like her and that they gave her homemade bows, which had become part of her signature look. Because of her popularity, the company produced a new television series entitled Emma!, featuring Watkins as a solo performer, which aired in 2015. Up to 80% of the audience at Wiggles concerts would emulate her costuming and wear yellow; by 2021 it was estimated that 50% of the group's merchandising was specific to the "Emma" brand.

In September 2019, it was announced that Watkins would host weekend afternoon programs on Sydney and Melbourne radio station smoothfm. In October 2020, Watkins appeared in the music video for "Back 2 Back" by Samantha Jade. At the 2020 ARIA Music Awards in November, she joined an ensemble of Australian women singers to perform "I Am Woman" as a tribute to its singer and songwriter, Helen Reddy.

It was reported through corporate filings that Watkins had acquired approximately 8% ownership of the Wiggles' brand as well as a company directorship in June 2018. Watkins announced her departure from the Wiggles in October 2021 and was replaced by Tsehay Hawkins.

2022–present: Emma Memma
In early 2022, Watkins hinted at the introduction of a new children's entertainment character, Emma Memma, through her social media. The new character was designed to incorporate elements of song, dance and sign language. Toronto-based company Headspinner Productions announced their partnership with Watkins in July 2022 to debut the character in a new pre-school television series entitled Emma Memma: Sing. Dance. Sign. Watkins was appointed as an executive producer for the series, to be produced through her company Apricot Sea. The series is expected to begin filming in early 2023 for release later in the year. The character and its design were officially revealed in July; music videos were subsequently released through YouTube. 

During this period, Watkins competed on the fourth season of the Australian version of The Masked Singer as "Zombie" placing eighth. She also appeared as a celebrity contestant on the 2022 Lego Masters Australia Christmas special. Watkins provided the narration for the ABC children's series Reef School in 2022.

Personal life
Watkins and fellow Wiggles performer Lachlan Gillespie were married on 9 April 2016 at Hopewood House in Bowral, New South Wales. On 3 August 2018, Watkins and Gillespie announced their separation.

In April 2018, Watkins was forced to withdraw from several shows, suffering from pain caused by severe endometriosis. She underwent surgery after being diagnosed with Stage IV endometriosis. Her specialist, Professor Jason Abbott, believes that Watkins' speaking out about her diagnosis helped raise awareness of the condition.

On 5 April 2021, Watkins announced her engagement to Oliver Brian, a musician who works with the Wiggles. They had begun dating in December 2019. On 2 May 2022, she and Brian were married.

Publications
 Hello, Emma Memma (February 2023)

Discography

Filmography

References

External links

 
 

1989 births
21st-century Australian actresses
21st-century Australian dancers
21st-century Australian musicians
21st-century Australian singers
Actresses from Sydney
Australian children's musicians
Australian drummers
Australian female dancers
Australian women singers
Australian musical theatre actresses
Australian women guitarists
Living people
Singers from Sydney
The Wiggles members
University of Technology Sydney alumni